George Winston (born December 26, 1949) is an American pianist, guitarist, harmonicist, and record producer. He was born in Michigan and raised mainly in Montana (Miles City and Billings), as well as Mississippi and Florida. He is best known for his solo piano recordings. Each of several of his albums from the early 1980s have sold millions of copies. He plays in three styles: the melodic approach he developed that he calls "rural folk piano"; stride piano, primarily inspired by Thomas "Fats" Waller and Teddy Wilson; and his primary interest, New Orleans R&B piano, influenced by James Booker, Professor Longhair, and Henry Butler.

Early life and education
When growing up, Winston's musical interests lay with instrumentals of the R&B, rock, pop, and jazz genres, especially those by organists. After hearing The Doors in 1967, he was inspired to start playing the organ. In 1971, he switched to solo piano after hearing the stride pianists Thomas "Fats" Waller, Teddy Wilson, and later Earl Hines, Donald Lambert, and Cleo Brown.

After graduating from Coral Gables Senior High School in Coral Gables, Florida in 1967, Winston attended Stetson University in DeLand, Florida, in the 1960s, where he majored in sociology.  While he did not complete his undergraduate degree, following his rise to prominence the university awarded him an honorary doctor of arts degree.

Career 
Winston was first recorded by John Fahey for Fahey's Takoma Records. His debut album Piano Solos disappeared without much notice, although it was later reissued on Winston's Dancing Cat Records under the title Ballads and Blues 1972. In 1979, William Ackerman talked with Winston about recording for Ackerman's new record label, Windham Hill Records. At first, Winston played some guitar pieces he liked and then some of his nighttime music on the piano. These became the basis for the record Autumn, which Ackerman produced. Autumn soon became the best-selling record in the Windham Hill catalog. Both Autumn and the following album Winter into Spring went platinum, signifying million-plus shipment in the United States. The Christmas album December became an even greater success, and it was certified triple platinum for shipment of three million.  He has recorded twelve more solo piano albums. He is one of the best known performers playing contemporary instrumental music.

Winston released two albums of the music of Vince Guaraldi. He has been interested in Guaraldi's music since he was sixteen when the animated TV special A Charlie Brown Christmas premiered in 1965, and he bought the soundtrack album the next day featuring the music of  Guaraldi.  He would also watch each new Peanuts special to hear Guaraldi's newest music. In 1996, Winston released Linus and Lucy: The Music of Vince Guaraldi, primarily devoted to the theme music Guaraldi wrote for the Peanuts cartoons: fifteen television specials and one feature film, ranging from 1965 until Guaraldi’s death in 1976. "I love his melodies and his chord progressions," Winston said of Guaraldi. "He has a really personal way of doing voicings." Winston recorded a follow-up album, Love Will Come: The Music of Vince Guaraldi, Volume 2, released in February 2010.  A third volume, entitled Count the Ways: The Music of Vince Guaraldi, Volume 3, released in 2021.

Winston's 2002 album Night Divides the Day – The Music of the Doors consists of solo piano renditions of music by the rock band The Doors. The title of the album is a lyric from their song "Break on Through (To the Other Side)".

In addition to his piano work, Winston plays solo harmonica (mainly Appalachian fiddle tunes and ballads) and solo acoustic guitar (mainly Appalachian fiddle tunes and Hawaiian slack-key guitar pieces). Both his harmonica and guitar playing can be heard on his benefit album Remembrance - A Memorial Benefit, which was released shortly after the September 11 attacks. In 2006, he recorded another benefit album, Gulf Coast Blues & Impressions: A Hurricane Relief Benefit, followed by Gulf Coast Blues & Impressions 2: A Louisiana Wetlands Benefit in 2012.

Winston also produces recordings of Hawaiian slack-key guitarists for his own record label, Dancing Cat Records, including artists Keola Beamer, Sonny Chillingworth, Leonard Kwan, Dennis Kamakahi, Ray Kane, Cyril Pahinui, Bla Pahinui, Martin Pahinui, Ledward Kaapana, Georg Kuo, Ozzie Kotani, George Kahumoku, Jr., Moses Kahumoku, Cindy Combs, and others. He is also working on recording the American traditional musicians Sam Hinton, Rick Epping, and Curt Bouterse.

Winston suffered from a number of illnesses, and while recuperating from a bout of cancer, he played the piano in the medical center auditorium, creating 21 pieces, that he says were "kind of circular" and "minimalist." In 2014, he included three of the pieces in a Spring Carousel EP, and a 15-track album, called Spring Carousel - A Cancer Research Benefit released on March 31. Proceeds benefit City of Hope Hospital near Los Angeles, where he was treated and subsequently composed the musical work.

On May 3, 2019, Winston released his 15th solo piano album, Restless Wind. The eleven-song collection includes his interpretations of music by Sam Cooke, The Doors, Stephen Stills, George and Ira Gershwin, Country Joe McDonald, among others. "By virtue of his boundless imagination, Winston’s musical portrayals provide new textures and tones that illuminate the original compositions while discovering fresh insights and common musical themes," wrote Jazziz about Restless Wind. The album debuted at #1 on the Billboard New Age Charts, and #2 on the Billboard Jazz Charts.

To kick off the release, Winston performed a concert at Pittsburgh's Carnegie of Homestead Music Hall that benefit the Creative Arts Program, which provides scholarships to pay for music therapy.

All of Winston's albums are available on his own Dancing Cat Records, with the exception of the last four releases, which came out on RCA Records.

In July 2019, at the National Music Council’s 2019 American Eagle Award Honor ceremony that recognized Vince Guaraldi, Winston performed his versions of the musician's work. From his grand piano, Winston told the audience:

Musical and performance style 
Many of Winston’s melodic pieces are self-described as "rural folk piano" or "folk piano", a style he developed in 1971 to complement the uptempo Stride piano he had been inspired to play by Fats Waller’s recordings from the 1920s and 1930s. These melodic pieces evoke the essence of a season and reflect natural landscapes. The third style he plays is New Orleans R&B piano, influenced mainly by James Booker, Professor Longhair, Henry Butler, as well as Dr. John and Jon Cleary.

Winston dresses unassumingly for his shows, playing in stocking feet, stating that it quiets his "hard beat pounding" left foot. For years, the balding, bearded Winston would walk out on stage in a flannel shirt and jeans, and the audience would think he was a technician, coming to tune the 9-foot New York Steinways that are his piano of choice. According to the Austin American Statesman in 2015: "As for his piano playing, Winston remains a master of both tone and invention. Starting with a bluesy tune inspired by Professor Longhair — Winston’s most recent albums have included two Gulf Coast-inspired collections — he proceeded through seasonal favorites "Rain" (from 1982's Winter Into Spring) and "Woods" (from 1980’s Autumn). On the latter, he created remarkable 'hollowed' sounds to some notes by reaching inside the piano and muting strings with one hand while striking keys with the other."

On April 19, 2010, he appeared as the sole guest on show 575 of the multimedia WoodSongs Old-Time Radio Hour. Twenty minutes into the program, he describes an unusual method of playing the piano muting the strings, a development inspired by watching blues guitar players. He can be seen reaching into the piano with his left hand and muting the strings, while with his right hand he is playing "An African in the Americas".

Personal life
Winston resides in Santa Cruz, California.

Winston has survived several serious illnesses, including thyroid cancer, skin cancer, and myelodysplastic syndrome, the latter of which was resolved following a bone marrow transplant in 2013.

Discography

Studio albums

Solo harmonica album 
 2012 Harmonica Solos

Benefit EPs, albums and singles 
 2001 Remembrance - A Memorial Benefit  (piano, guitar & harmonica solos)
 2013 "Silent Night - A Benefit Single for Feeding America"
 2015 Spring Carousel - A Cancer Research Benefit EP

Soundtracks 
 1984 The Velveteen Rabbit (solo piano soundtrack with narration by Meryl Streep)
 1988 This is America Charlie Brown—The Birth of the Constitution (piano & harpsichord  solos)
 1995 Sadako and the Thousand Paper Cranes (solo guitar soundtrack with narration by Liv Ullmann)
 2002 Pumpkin Circle (solo piano, guitar and harmonica soundtrack with narration by Danny Glover)
 2003 Bread Comes to Life (solo piano, guitar and harmonica soundtrack with narration by Lily Tomlin)

References

External links

1949 births
Grammy Award winners
Living people
Musicians from Michigan
Guitarists from Montana
New-age pianists
People from Miles City, Montana
Stetson University alumni
Stride pianists
Windham Hill Records artists
American male guitarists
20th-century American guitarists
20th-century American pianists
American male pianists
21st-century American pianists
20th-century American male musicians
21st-century American male musicians
American male jazz musicians
20th-century American composers